Don't Tell Me the Boy Was Mad (French title: Une histoire de fou) is a 2015 French drama film co-written, produced and directed by Robert Guédiguian. The film is based on the true story of a Spanish journalist, José Antonio Gurriarán, who was left in a semi-paralyzed state after a bomb attack by the Armenian Secret Army for the Liberation of Armenia in Madrid in 1981. He then recounted his experiences in an autobiographical novel La Bomba, which serves as the source material for the film. The film was screened in the Special Screenings section at the 2015 Cannes Film Festival.

Cast 
 Simon Abkarian as Hovannès 
 Ariane Ascaride as Anouch
 Grégoire Leprince-Ringuet as Gilles
 Syrus Shahidi as Aram  
 Razane Jammal as Anahit
 Robinson Stévenin as Soghomon Tehlirian  
 Siro Fazilian as Arsinée 
 Amir Abou El Kacem as Vahé 
 Rania Mellouli as Nounée
 Hrayr Kalemkerian as Haïk
 Rodney Haddad as Vrej
 Lola Naymark as Valérie 
 Serge Avedikian as Armenak
 Omar Mikati as Narguiz

References

External links 
 

2015 films
2015 drama films
2010s French-language films
French drama films
Films directed by Robert Guédiguian
Films based on biographies
Films scored by Alexandre Desplat
2010s French films